CoRoT-11b is a transiting exoplanet found by the CoRoT space telescope in 2010.

It is a hot Jupiter-sized planet orbiting a F6V star with Te = 6343K, M = 1.27M☉, R = 1.36R☉, and nearly-solar metallicity. It has an estimated age between 1.0 and 3.0 Gyr.

References

Hot Jupiters
Transiting exoplanets
Exoplanets discovered in 2010
11b